{{Album ratings
| rev1      = Drowned In Sound 
| rev1Score = 
| rev2      = Kerrang! 
| rev2Score = 
| rev3      = Terrorizer 
| rev3Score = 
}}Cult of Luna'' is the debut studio album by Swedish post-metal band Cult of Luna, released in 2001. It was originally released by Rage of Achilles, and later by Earache Records after the band signed a record contract.

Track listing 
All tracks written by Cult of Luna.

Personnel

Band members
 Marco Hildèn – drums and percussion
 Magnus Lindberg – samples, guitar and engineering
 Erik Olofsson – guitar
 Johannes Persson – guitar and vocals
 Klas Rydberg – vocals
 Axel Stattin – bass

Other personnel
 Mats Hammarström – engineering, mixing and piano
 Pelle Henricsson – mastering
 Jan Jämte – additional vocals
 Jonathan Leijonhufvud – album art and design
 Lovisa Nyström – cello
 Jonas Rosén – additional vocals

References

Cult of Luna albums
2001 debut albums
Earache Records albums